Amarnath Temple is a Hindu shrine located in Anantnag district of Jammu and Kashmir, India. The shrine represents an important part of Hinduism. The cave, located in Lidder Valley, is surrounded by glaciers, snowy mountains and is covered with snow most of the year, except for a short period in the summer, when it is open to pilgrims. In 1989, pilgrims numbered between 12,000 and 30,000. In 2011, the numbers reached a peak, crossing 6.3 lakh (630,000) pilgrims. In 2018 pilgrims numbered 2.85 lakh (285,000). The annual pilgrimage has varied between 20 and 60 days.

The Amarnath cave, abode of the Mahamaya Shakti Peetha, is one of the 51 Shakti Peethas, temples on the Indian Subcontinent that commemorate the location of fallen body parts of the Hindu deity Sati.

Shiva Linga

The Shiva Lingam at the shrine is a Swayambhu lingam. The stalagmite is formed due to the freezing of water drops that fall from the roof of the cave onto the floor, resulting in an upward growth of an ice formation. Here, the stalagmites considered as the lingam, a physical manifestation of Shiva, form a solid-dome-shape. Two smaller stalagmites are thought to represent Parvati and Ganesha.

According to the ancient Hindu texts of the Mahabharata and Puranas a lingam represents Shiva. The lingam waxes during May to August, as snow melts in the Himalayas above the cave, and water seeps into the rocks of the cave; thereafter, the lingam gradually wanes. Religious beliefs hold that the lingam grows and shrinks with the phases of the moon, reaching its height during the summer festival. Hindus believe this is the place where Shiva explained the secret of life and eternity to his divine consort, Parvati.

Lidder Valley, where the cave is located, has a number of glaciers. In 2009, glaciologist M. N. Koul, the former head of the geography department at the University of Jammu, has said that while more scientific studies are needed, contributors to change in lingam size could include changes in the water's pathways to the lingum. The cave is made of limestone and gypsum. Heat generated by tourists affects the size of the stalagmite. Outside temperate changes also affect their size. To minimize artificially induced temperature changes, helicopter trips and helipad sites are regulated.  There has been talk of artificially extending the life of the stalagmites, this has met with objections.

History

Ancient history 
The book Rajatarangini (Book VII v. 183) refers to Krishaanth or Amarnath. It is believed that in the 11th century CE, Queen Suryamati gifted trishulas, banalingas and other sacred emblems to this temple. Rajavalipataka, begun by Prajna Bhatta, contains detailed references to the pilgrimage to Amarnath Cave Temple. In addition, there are further references to this pilgrimage in many other ancient texts.

Medieval history

François Bernier, a French physician, accompanied Emperor Aurangzeb during his visit to Kashmir in 1663. In his book Travels in Mughal Empire, he provides an account of the places he visited, noting that he was "pursuing journey to a grotto full of wonderful congelations, two days journey from Sangsafed" when he "received intelligence that my Nawab felt very impatient and uneasy on account of my long absence." The "grotto" referenced in this passage is obviously the Amarnath cave — as the editor of the second edition of the English translation of the book, Vincent A. Smith, makes clear in his introduction. He writes: "The grotto full of wonderful congelations is the Amarnath cave, where blocks of ice, stalagmites formed by dripping water from the roof are worshipped by many Hindus who resort here as images of Shiva...."

Modern history
In 1895, pilgrims would first travel to Kheer Bhawani for a brief stop. Sustained by free rations from the state, the pilgrims would then travel to Srinagar. From Srinagar, in batches, the pilgrims would then head up Lidder Valley, stopping at locations for holy dips. At Mach Bawan, local Hindus would join them. Maliks of Batok were responsible for the route during these years. Sister Nivedita, in Notes of Some Wanderings with the Swami Vivekananda, writes of Swami Vivekananda's visit to the cave in 1898.

Yatra suspensions and causes

2016: Kashmir unrest 
The Amarnath pilgrimage was suspended in July 2016 due to the Kashmir unrest. Some Sufis and Shias later demanded resumption of the Yatra. Kalbe Jawad, a Shia cleric and general secretary of Majlis-e-Ulama-e-Hind and Sufi cleric Hasnain Baqai expressed concern that the tradition had been suspended because of upheaval in Kashmir.

2019: Threat of terrorist attack
The pilgrimage was suspended in August 2019 after the state government stated there was a threat of possible terrorist attacks. Similarly, the pilgrimage to Machail Mata was suspended as well. However, it was also speculated that the Yatra suspension might have been linked to the revocation of the special status of Jammu and Kashmir.

2020 and 2021: COVID-19 pandemic 
The annual pilgrimage was cancelled in the year 2020 and 2021 due to COVID-19 pandemic. On 22 April 2020, the Shri Amarnath Ji Shrine Board announced the suspension of the Yatra because of the COVID-19 pandemic in India. Later however it withdrew the press circular and announced cancellation of the suspension. Lieutenant Governor G. C. Murmu said that a final decision would depend on future developments related to the pandemic. In light of the pandemic, the union territory government on 4 July announced that only 500 people would be permitted road travel to the shrine and everyone entering Jammu and Kashmir would be tested for COVID-19, and quarantined until their reports came back negative. The pilgrimage was later cancelled on 21 July due to the pandemic, with cases of coronavirus in the union territory increasing greatly since 1 July. Facilities for viewing the prayer ceremony online were made available.

The shrine board on 27 March 2022 decided to resume the pilgrimage after a gap of two years, starting from 30 June and lasting for 43 days, while following protocols to prevent the spread of COVID.

2022: temporary suspension due to flash flood 
On 8 July 2022, at least 16 people were killed, over 40 missing, and dozens were injured while around 15000 pilgrims were stranded near the Amarnath Holy cave due to a flash flood triggered by a cloudburst near the Lidder Valley en route to the venerated cave. The Amarnath Yatra was halted due to the flash flood on 8 July for 3 days.

Legends
According to legend, Sage Bhrigu was the first to have discovered Amarnath. A long time ago, it is believed that the Valley of Kashmir was submerged underwater, and Sage Kashyapa drained it through a series of rivers and rivulets. As a result, when the waters drained, Bhrigu was the first to have darshan of Shiva at Amarnath. Thereafter, when people heard of the lingam, it became an abode of Shiva for all believers and the site of an annual pilgrimage, traditionally performed by lakhs of people in July and August during the Hindu Holy month of Savan.

It is believed that Shiva left Nandi, the bull, at Pahalgam (Bail Gaon). At Chandanwari, he released the Moon from his hair (Jata). On the banks of Lake Sheshnag, he released his snake. At Mahagunas Parvat (Mahaganesh Mountain), he left his son Ganesha. At Panjtarni, Shiva left behind the five elements - Earth, Water, Air, Fire and Sky. As a symbol of sacrificing the earthly world, Shiva performed the Tandava Dance. Then, finally, Shiva entered the Amarnath Cave along with Parvati and both of them manifested into a Lingam made of ice. Shiva became the lingam of ice and Parvati became the yoni of rock.

Yatra (pilgrimage) details and routes

Pilgrimage opening timeframe: July-Aug during ice lingam formation

Pilgrims visit the holy site during the 45-day season around the festival of Shravani Mela in July–August, coinciding with the Hindu holy month of Shraavana. The Amarnath Yatra  pilgrimage occurs when the iced stalagmite Shiva lingam reaches the apex of its waxing phase through the summer months. The period of July–August is a popular time for the pilgrimage. The beginning of the annual pilgrimage is marked by pratham pujan.

The time frame, during which the pilgrimage remains open, depends on the formation of iced lingam. For example, in 1995 the pilgrimage remained open for 20 days. From 2004 to 2009, it remained open for 60 days. During the following years, it remained open for between 40 and 60 days. In 2019, the Yatra remained open for 46 days from 1 July to 15 August.

State quotas and mandatory pilgrim pre-registration & e-tracking 

Pilgrims have to pre-register months in advance and are allotted quotas according to state. States compromising a majority of the allotment include Uttar Pradesh, Punjab, Gujarat, Maharashtra and West Bengal. To ensure the health and safety of the pilgrims, such as during the disaster or medical emergency etc., each pilgrim and vehicle is given a unique wearable traceable identification tag which are scanned at the several designated places along the pilgrim route. Since 2019, pilgrims are given identification cards for the duration of the pilgrimage which are scanned at several locations for tracing the pilgrims. Similarly, the vehicles are also tracked via the tags, so that the entire pilgrimage can be traced. the registration fee in 2022, on the "first come, first serve basis", was INR150 per pilgrim.

Transport and roads 

Nearest airport is Srinagar International Airport. Nearest railway stations are on the Jammu-Baramulla line - Srinagar railway station for the north pilgrim route through Baltal and Anantnag railway station for the south route via Pahalgam-Chandanwari. The State Road Transport Corporation and private transport operators provide the regular services from Jammu to Pahalgam and Baltal. Also privately hired taxis are available from Jammu, Anantnag, Pahalgam, Srinagar, etc.

On the south route via Pahalgam-Chandanwari, the helicopter services from Chandanwari base camp to Panjtarni (6 km from the cave) are also available from various private operators.

Chandanwari-Sangam Highway as part of NH501, including 11 km long Khanabal-Baltal Tunnel (Sheshnag Tunnel) under the Mahaganus Top (Ganesh Top), is the 22 km long greenfield section of the national highway on the South Route which will connect the South and North yatra routes via the highway tunnel. In January 2023, MoRTH's NHIDCL invited RFP submissions by vendors by 20 Feb 2023 for preparation of DPR (detailed project report) which will take 10 months to prepare, subsequently after 2 months long pre-construction preparation the construction will take 5 years, with the target completion date of 31 March 2029 (total 6 years).

2 main routes

Presently, devotees travel on two main routes which are partially motorable and partially foot-track near to the holy cave: the shorter but steeper 13 km northern route from Baltal Basecamp, and the longer but easier and more popular-busier 43 km Pahalgam-Chandanwari basecamp route.

South route - 43 km: Pahalgam-Chandanwari route 

It begins with a  mountainous trek from the Nunwan and Chandanwari basecamp at Pahalgam and reaches cave-shrine after night halts at Sheshnag Lake and Panchtarni camps. The journey from Pahalgam takes about five days. It runs from Pahalgam (on Jammu-Srinagar NH) to Chandanwari Basecamp (9,500 ft) - 16 km, Pissu Top - 3 km, Zoji Bal-Naga Koti-Sheshnag (11,730 ft) - 9 km, Waribal-Mahaguns Yop (Ganesh Top, 14,500 ft) - 4.6 km, Pabibal-Panchtarni (22,729 ft)-Sangam (T-section for North route via Baltal) - 6 km, Amarnath cave - 3 km. Whole foot track route takes 3 to 5 days one way.

The route is motorable up to Chandanwari, which will become motorable up to Sangam after construction of NH501 Chandanwari-Baltal Highway which includes Khanabal-Baltal Tunnel (Sheshnag Tunnel) under the Mahaganus Top (Ganesh Top), see "Transport" section above. Once completed, all the route will become motorable except the last 3 km from Sangam to Amarnath cave.

North route - 13 km: Baltal route 

It runs from Baltal basecamp to Domail - 2 km, Barari - 5 km, Sangam (T-section for South route via Pahalgam-Chandanwari) - 4 km, Amarnath cave - 3 km. This track is motorable till Baltal and Baltal-Amarnath foot track takes 1 to 2 days return trip. Once the NH501 from Pahalgam-Chandanwari to Baltal is completed, including Sheshnag-Sangam tunnel under the Mahaguns Top (Ganesh Top), this route will become motorable except last 3 km from Sangam to Amarnath cave. This shorter route is just about 14 km long, but has a very steep gradient and is quite difficult to climb. The route is along the Amarnath valley and all along the route one can see the Amaravati river (a tributary of Chenab) which originates from the Amarnath Glacier.

Ancient route: Awantipur-Pissu Top-Sheshnag-Panchtarni

Bhrigu's Amarnath Mahatmya identifies a number of location on the pilgrimage on the way to the Amarnath cave: Shurahyar, Shivpora, Pandrethan, Pampore, Javati, Awantipur, Barsu, Jaubror, Belihar, Wagahama, Chakreshwar (Tsakdar), Hari Chandar, Sthalwat (Thajwor), Suryai Gohwat (Sriguphvara), Lambodari, Sirham, Bodrus, Bala Khelyan, Ganish, Mammaleshwar, Bhrigupati Kshetra, Nila Ganga, Pissu Hill (Pissu Top), Sheshnag, Wavjan, Panchtarni, Amravati. On the return journey Mamleshwar and Naudal are crossed. Following the construction of drivable road, alignment of this pilgrimage route has presently changed at some places (which has now become "South route" - see above).

Organization and facilities

Officially, the Yatra is organised by the government in collaboration with the Shree Amarnath Shrine Board (SASB). Various agencies provide necessary facilities all along the route during the Yatra period, which includes provision of ponies, supply of power, telecommunication facilities, firewood and setting up of fair price shops.

En-route the cave, various non-governmental organisations have set up food supply and resting tents called pandals which are available for free to the pilgrims. Near the shrine, hundreds of tents which are erected by locals can be hired for a night's stay.

Srinagar Pilgrimage Centre, with capacity to host 3000 yatris, facilitates pilgrims' stay who are travelling for the holy pilgrimage. The state government began its construction in May 2022.

Security of pilgrims 

Every year, thousands of central armed forces and state police personnel are deployed to provide security to pilgrims from potential terror threats. The forces position at various halts and also in the perimeter of the shrine. This includes CRPF, BSF, ITBP, NDRF/SDRF and state police and traffic police.

Economic impact of yatra

The yatra is a way of earning revenue for the state government by imposing tax on pilgrims. Local Muslim Bakarwal-Gujjars also make a living by offering services to the Hindu pilgrims. This source of income has been threatened by the Kashmiri militant groups who have harassed and attacked the yatra numerous times.

Annual number of pilgrims  

The number of annual pilgrims having generally rising consistently from between 12,000-20,000-30,000 in 1989, to over 400,000 in 2007, 634,000 in 2011, 622,000 in 2012, 350,000 in 2013, 285,006 in 2018.

Incidents

Deaths due to health, accidents and disasters
Sir Walter Roper Lawrence in The Valley of Kashmir (1895) writes that the difficulty of pilgrimage route affected the weak and sick, with many also falling victims to cholera. In 1928, over 500 pilgrims and mules died on the way to the cave. In 1969 a cloudburst resulted in the death of 40 pilgrims. The 1996 Amarnath Yatra tragedy involved the death of 243 pilgrims due to exhaustion and exposure. In July 2012, 12 pilgrims were killed in a road accident. The pilgrims were part of a team who had set up a community kitchen at the pilgrimage. Three people were killed and more injured due to a cloudburst at Baltal in 2015. Of the 622,000 yatra pilgrims in 2012, 130 died during the yatra. The major cause was attributed to people who were not physically fit for the arduous climb, high elevations, and adverse weather undertook the yatra. Some also died in road accidents before reaching the base camp from where the yatra starts. Of the 130 deaths, 88 were due to purported health reasons and 42 in road accidents. On 16 July 2017, 18 pilgrims died and many were seriously injured after a JKSRTC bus, which was plying from Jammu city to Pahalgam as part of Amarnath Yatra Convoy, fell into a 150-ft deep gorge near Nachlana area of Jammu's Ramban district around 1:45 P.M. 16 pilgrims had died on the spot, while 2 succumbed later to their injuries. This accident happened less than a week after a deadly terrorist attack on a bus carrying Amarnath Yatra pilgrims from Gujarat.

On 8 July 2022, at around 5:30 pm, flash floods due to localised cloudburst near the holy cave shrine washed away scores of pilgrims. According to reports, at least fifteen pilgrims died in the incident. Jammu and Kashmir lieutenant-governor Manoj Sinha announced compensation of Rs 5 lakh each to the families of the 15 pilgrims who died in the flash floods.

Threats, attacks, and massacres 
The first threat targeted against Amarnath pilgrims was in 1993; that year Pakistan-based Harkat-ul-Ansar had announced a ban due to demolition of Babri Masjid in the previous year. The pilgrimage however was mostly peacefully. The Harkat-ul-Mujahideen group imposed what it called a "ban" on the yatra in 1994, 1995 and 1998 while threatening the pilgrims of "serious consequences", however the pilgrimage did continue.

2000 pilgrimage massacre

On 2 August 2000, militants attacked the Nunwan base camp in Pahalgam. 32 people, including 21 unarmed Hindu pilgrims, 7 unarmed Muslim civilians and 3 security force officers, in a two hour long indiscriminate shoot, were killed. Among the dead were mostly pilgrims or porters and horsemen who were ferrying pilgrims. This attack was part of the larger 1-2 August 2000 Kashmir massacre in 5 separate coordinated terrorist attacks that killed at least 89 (official count) to 105 people (as reported by PTI), and injured at least 62 more. Then Indian Prime Minister Atal Bihari Vajpayee blamed Lashkar-e-Taiba for the killings.

2001 massacre 

On 20 July 2001, a terrorist threw a grenade on a pilgrim night camp at Sheshnag near the Amarnath shrine in which at least 13 persons, including 3 women, were killed in two explosions and firing by militants, 2 were security officials and 3 of the killed person were Muslim civilians. 15 other were also injured in the attack.

2002 massacre 

On 30 July and 6 August 2002, in two separate incidents terrorists from al-Mansuriyan, a front group of the Lashkar-e-Taiba, massacred 2 and 9 pilgrims and injured 3 and 27 people in Srinagar and near Nunwan pilgrimage base camp respectively.

2017 yatra attack 

Eight Hindu pilgrims were killed on 10 July in a gun attack returning from Amarnath. The Pakistani outfit, the Lashkar-e-Taiba, was found responsible.

Controversies

2008 Land transfer controversy

On 26 May 2008, the Government of India and the state government of Jammu and Kashmir reached an agreement to transfer  of forest land to the Shri Amarnathji Shrine Board (SASB) to set up temporary shelters and facilities for Hindu pilgrims. Kashmiri separatists opposed the move citing reasons that it will jeopardize the article 370 that gives separate identity to the people of Jammu and Kashmir and prevents any Indian citizen to settle in Kashmir. People in Kashmir staged widespread protests against this decision by government of India. Due to the protests, the J&K State government relented and reversed the decision to transfer land. As a result, Hindus in the Jammu region launched counter-agitations against this roll back.

Environmental impact

Environmentalists have expressed concern that the number of people participating in the Amarnath Yatra is having a negative impact on the area's ecology and some have expressed support for government regulated limits on the number of pilgrims permitted to make the trek. However no studies have been made nor has an environmental impact assessment done. As of date, the Government of India restricts travellers only on the basis on logistics, time window for the yatra and weather.

Amarnath Cave Temple Yatra tax controversy

The Government of Jammu and Kashmir had in 2010 issued a notification under the State Motor Vehicle Taxation Act 1957, under which vehicles going to Amarnath Yatra will have to pay a tax of  2,000 for seven days and  2,000 per day after that. Similar provisions were made for pilgrims going to Sri Mata Vaishno Devi under which they need to pay  2000 for a period of three days. India's central political party the Bharatiya Janata Party expressed its ire over imposition of entry fee and accused the then UPA led central government to direct the Jammu and Kashmir dispensation to desist from making attempts to "discriminate" between followers of various religions. BJP criticized the decision "as a reminiscent of Jizya imposed during Mughal period on Hindus," In response to the question in Lok Sabha (Lower house of the Indian Parliament) then Minister of State for Finance, S. S. Palanimanickam clarified that tax is levied on all India Tourist Vehicles entering the state and is therefore not correct to say that Government of Jammu & Kashmir is levying any additional tax on vehicles going to Amarnath and Vaishno Devi. He also said that Taxation of Motor vehicles falls under the purview of State Governments as per the seventh schedule of Constitution of India and Central Government cannot direct the State Government to change the tax rate on vehicles.

Popular culture
Famous Santoor artist Rahul Sharma named a track after Amarnath Cave temple as "Shiva Linga: The Amarnath Cave"

Gallery

See also 
 Kanwar Yatra, another popular Hindu pilgrimage
 List of caves in India
 List of rock-cut temples in India

References

Bibliography

Further reading 

 Shah, A. R. (2013). A Sociology Lens of Pilgrimage Tourism in Kashmir Valley: A Case of Holy Amarnath Pilgrimage. The Tibet Journal, 38(3–4), 57–85.

Pilgrim health
 
  
  
 

Environment

External links 

 
 Amarnath: Journey to the shrine of a Hindu god, Boston Globe news story in pictures, 13 July 2012.

Hindu cave temples in India
Shiva temples in Jammu and Kashmir
Hindu temples in Jammu and Kashmir
Hindu pilgrimage sites in India
Caves of Jammu and Kashmir